High Performance was a quarterly arts magazine based out of Los Angeles founded in 1978 and published until 1997. Its editorial mission was to provide support and a critical context for new, innovative and unrecognized work in the arts.

High Performance started out covering exclusively performance art and gradually grew to include video, sound, and public art. It dealt with viewing the arts in the larger context of contemporary life, examining how the arts contribute in addressing social and cultural concerns, and also how those concerns impact the arts. In 1994, High Performance received the Alternative Press Award for Cultural Coverage from the Utne Reader, and was nominated three other times for the same award.

Editors and publishers
Linda Frye Burnham served as the magazine's founding editor from 1978 to 1985. Steven Durland was the editor from 1986 until its end in 1997. From 1983 to 1995, High Performance was published by Astro Artz (renamed 18th Street Arts Center in 1988). In July 1995, High Performance was acquired by Art in the Public Interest (API), a new organization formed by Burnham and Durland to research and develop information about artists collaborating with their communities. After a brief hiatus, the magazine renewed publication in early 1996 and published five more issues, but rising costs and an inability to garner needed stabilization funding forced API to cease publication in 1997. In 1999, Burnham and Durland initiated the Community Arts Network on the Web. Much of the content from High Performance is available on that site.

External links
 High Performance Magazine Complete Issue List  Art in the Public Interest
 Finding aid for High Performance magazine records, 1953-2005, Getty Research Institute, Los Angeles.

References

Visual arts magazines published in the United States
Quarterly magazines published in the United States
Performance art in Los Angeles
Magazines established in 1978
Magazines disestablished in 1997
Performance art
Contemporary art magazines
Defunct magazines published in the United States
Magazines published in Los Angeles